Saalijalgpalli Meistriliiga is the premier futsal league in Estonia. It was founded in 2006. Organized by Estonian Football Association, it is played under UEFA and FIFA rules.

Champions

*Winners declared based on league table, not play-offs due to COVID-19 pandemic

References

External links
 Current Season at UEFA.com

Futsal in Estonia
Estonia
futsal
2006 establishments in Estonia
Sports leagues established in 2006
Futsal